Calyptoproctus elegans is a species of planthopper in the family Fulgoridae. It is found from Brazil north to Honduras.

References 

 Fick, W. 1985. Zur Morphologie und histologie des Darmtraktes von Hyalodictyon truncatum, Calyptoproctus elegans und Fulgora laternaria (Homoptera, Auchenorrhyncha, Fulgoromorpha). Mitteilungen der Deutschen Gesellschaft für Allgemeine und Angewandte Entomologie 4(4-6): 180-183.

External links 

 
 Calyptoproctus at canr.udel.edu/planthoppers/north-america

Insects described in 1791
Insects of Brazil
Arthropods of South America
Fauna of French Guiana
Insects of Central America
Fauna of Suriname
Poiocerinae